Hatshepsut (also Hatchepsut; Egyptian: ḥꜣt-špswt "Foremost of Noble Ladies"; or archaically Hatasu c. 1507–1458 BC) was an ancient Egyptian pharaoh, the fifth pharaoh of the Eighteenth Dynasty of Egypt. As the principal wife of Thutmose II, Hatshepsut initially ruled as regent to Thutmose III. While Thutmose III had inherited the throne at about two years old, Hatshepsut continued to rule by asserting her lineage as the daughter and only child of Thutmose I and his primary wife, Ahmose. Hatshepsut assumed the position of pharaoh or king  or 1479 BC and ruled until 1458 BC, the year of her death.

Hatshepsut's reign is well-known for increased prosperity, large-scale construction projects such as the Karnak Temple Complex, Speos Artemidos, the Mortuary Temple of Hatshepsut and Red Chapel of Hatshepsut (Chapelle Rouge). Hatshepsut and her supporters used traditional religious beliefs to re-enforce her role as pharaoh and king, despite these being considered men's roles.  

After her death, she was not mentioned in official accounts of Egyptian historiography by her successors, possibly due to sibling rivalry, political expediency, or due to her gender.

Early life and family 
Hatshepsut was married to Thutmose II, her half-brother, when she was 14 or 15 years old. They were around the same age when they got married.

Reign

Upon the death of Thutmose II, Thutmose III became the pharaoh of Egypt. Hatshepsut served as co-regent during his reign, and was thought of by early modern scholars as only having served as a co-regent alongside Thutmose III. However, modern scholars agree that Hatshepsut later assumed the position of pharaoh . Although queens Sobekneferu and Nitocris may have previously assumed the roles of pharaoh, Hatshepsut was the only female ruler to do so in a time of prosperity, and had more powers than her female predecessors.

Hatshepsut was described as having a reign of about 21 years by ancient authors. Josephus and Julius Africanus both quote Manetho's king list, mentioning a woman called Amessis or Amensis. This woman was later identified by historians as Hatshepsut. In Josephus' work, her reign is described as lasting 21 years and nine months, while Africanus stated it was 22 years. At this point in the history, records of the reign of Hatshepsut end, since the first major foreign campaign of Thutmose III was dated to his 22nd year, which also would have been Hatshepsut's 22nd year as pharaoh.

Dating the beginning of her reign is more difficult. Her father's reign began in either 1526 or 1506 BC according to the high and low estimates of her reign. The length of the reigns of Thutmose I and Thutmose II, however, cannot be determined with certainty. With short reigns, Hatshepsut would have ascended the throne 14 years after the coronation of Thutmose I, her father. Longer reigns would put her ascension 25 years after Thutmose I's coronation.

The earliest attestation of Hatshepsut as pharaoh occurs in the tomb of Ramose and Hatnofer, where a collection of grave goods contained a single pottery jar or amphora from the tomb's chamber—which was stamped with the date "Year 7". Another jar from the same tomb—which was discovered in situ by a 1935–36 Metropolitan Museum of Art expedition on a hillside near Thebes—was stamped with the seal of the "God's Wife Hatshepsut" while two jars bore the seal of "The Good Goddess Maatkare." The dating of the amphorae, "sealed into the [tomb's] burial chamber by the debris from Senenmut's own tomb", is undisputed, which means that Hatshepsut was acknowledged as pharaoh, and not queen, of Egypt by Year 7 of her reign.

Major accomplishments

Trade routes

Hatshepsut re-established a number of trade networks that had been disrupted during the Hyksos occupation of Egypt during the Second Intermediate Period. She oversaw the preparations and funding for a mission to the Land of Punt.

Hatshepsut's delegation returned from Punt bearing 31 live myrrh trees and other luxuries such as frankincense. Hatshepsut would grind the charred frankincense into kohl eyeliner. This is the first recorded use of the resin.

Hatshepsut had the expedition commemorated in relief at Deir el-Bahari, which is also famous for its realistic depiction of Queen Ati of the Land of Punt. Hatshepsut also sent raiding expeditions to Byblos and the Sinai Peninsula shortly after the Punt expedition. Very little is known about these expeditions. Although many Egyptologists have claimed that her foreign policy was mainly peaceful, it is possible that she led military campaigns against Nubia and Canaan.

Building projects

Hatshepsut was one of the most prolific builders in Ancient Egypt, commissioning hundreds of construction projects throughout both Upper Egypt and Lower Egypt. Many of these building projects were temples to build her religious base and legitimacy beyond her position as God's Wife of Amun. At these temples, she performed religious rituals that had hitherto been reserved for kings, corroborating the evidence that Hatshepsut assumed traditionally male roles as pharaoh. She employed the great architect Ineni, who also had worked for her father, her husband, and for the royal steward Senenmut. The extant artifacts of the statuary provide archaeological evidence of Hatshepsut's portrayals of herself as a male pharaoh, with physically masculine traits and traditionally male Ancient Egyptian garb, such as a false beard and ram's horns. These images are seen as symbolic, and not evidence of cross-dressing or androgyny.

Following the tradition of most pharaohs, Hatshepsut had monuments constructed at the Temple of Karnak. She also restored the original Precinct of Mut, the great ancient goddess of Egypt, at Karnak that had been ravaged by the foreign rulers during the Hyksos occupation. It later was ravaged by other pharaohs, who took one part after another to use in their own projects. The precinct awaits restoration. She had twin obelisks erected at the entrance to the temple which at the time of building were the tallest in the world. Only one remains upright, which is the second-tallest ancient obelisk still standing, the other having toppled and broken in two. The official in charge of those obelisks was the high steward Amenhotep. Another project, Karnak's Red Chapel, or Chapelle Rouge, was built as a barque shrine.

Later, she ordered the construction of two more obelisks to celebrate her 16th year as pharaoh; one of the obelisks broke during construction, and a third was therefore constructed to replace it. The broken obelisk was left at its quarrying site in Aswan, where it remains. Known as the Unfinished Obelisk, it provides evidence of how obelisks were quarried.

Hatshepsut built the Temple of Pakhet at Beni Hasan in the Minya Governorate south of Al Minya. The name, Pakhet, was a synthesis that occurred by combining Bast and Sekhmet, who were similar lioness war goddesses, in an area that bordered the north and south division of their cults. The cavernous underground temple, cut into the rock cliffs on the eastern side of the Nile, was admired and called the Speos Artemidos by the Greeks during their occupation of Egypt, known as the Ptolemaic Dynasty. They saw the goddess as akin to their hunter goddess, Artemis. The temple is thought to have been built alongside much more ancient ones that have not survived. This temple has an architrave with a long dedicatory text bearing Hatshepsut's famous denunciation of the Hyksos that James P. Allen has translated. This temple was altered later, and some of its insides were altered by Seti I of the Nineteenth Dynasty in an attempt to have his name replace that of Hatshepsut.

Following the tradition of many pharaohs, the masterpiece of Hatshepsut's building projects was a mortuary temple. She built hers in a complex at Deir el-Bahri. The identity of the architect behind the project remains unclear. It is possible that Senenmut, the Overseer of Works, or Hapuseneb, the High Priest, were responsible. It is also likely that Hatshepsut provided input to the project. Located opposite the city of Luxor, it is considered to be a masterpiece of ancient architecture. The complex's focal point was the Djeser-Djeseru or "the Holy of Holies".

Official lauding

Hyperbole is common to virtually all royal inscriptions of Egyptian history. While all ancient leaders used it to laud their achievements, Hatshepsut has been called the most accomplished pharaoh at promoting her accomplishments.

Hatshepsut assumed all the regalia and symbols of the Pharaonic office in official representations: the Khat head cloth, topped with the uraeus, the traditional false beard, and shendyt kilt. Hatshepsut was ambiguous and androgynous in many of her statues and monuments. She would create a masculine version of herself to establish herself in the Egyptian patriarchy.

Osirian statues of Hatshepsut—as with other pharaohs—depict the dead pharaoh as Osiris, with the body and regalia of that deity.

To further lay her claim to the throne, priests told a story of divine birth. In this myth, Amun goes to Ahmose in the form of Thutmose I. Hatshepsut is conceived by Ahmose. Khnum, the god who forms the bodies of human children, is then instructed to create a body and ka, or corporal presence/life force, for Hatshepsut. Heket, the goddess of life and fertility, and Khnum then lead Ahmose along to a place where she gives birth to Hatshepsut. Reliefs depicting each step in these events are at Karnak and in her mortuary temple.

The Oracle of Amun proclaimed that it was the will of Amun that Hatshepsut be pharaoh, further strengthening her position. She reiterated Amun's support by having these proclamations by the god Amun carved on her monuments:

Once she became pharaoh herself, Hatshepsut supported her assertion that she was her father's designated successor with inscriptions on the walls of her mortuary temple:

Death, burial, and mummification

Hatshepsut died in her 22nd regnal year. The precise date of Hatshepsut's death—and when Thutmose III became the next pharaoh of Egypt—is considered Year 22, II Peret day 10 of her reign, as recorded on a single stela erected at Armant on 16 January 1458 BC. This information validates the basic reliability of Manetho's king list records since Hatshepsut's known accession date was I Shemu day 4.

Hatshepsut began constructing a tomb when she was the Great Royal Wife of Thutmose II. Still, the scale of this was not suitable for a pharaoh, so when she ascended the throne, preparation for another burial started. For this, KV20, originally quarried for her father, Thutmose I, and probably the first royal tomb in the Valley of the Kings, was extended with a new burial chamber. Hatshepsut also refurbished her father's burial and prepared for a double interment of both Thutmose I and her within KV20. Therefore, it is likely that when she died (no later than the 22nd year of her reign), she was interred in this tomb along with her father.

During the reign of Thutmose III, however, a new tomb (KV38), together with new burial equipment, was provided for Thutmose I, who then was removed from his original tomb and re-interred elsewhere. At the same time, Hatshepsut's mummy might have been moved into the tomb of her nurse, Sitre In, in KV60. It is possible that Amenhotep II, son to Thutmose III by a secondary wife, was the one motivating these actions in an attempt to assure his own uncertain right to succession. Besides what was recovered from KV20 during egyptologist Howard Carter's clearance of the tomb in 1903, other funerary furniture belonging to Hatshepsut has been found elsewhere, including a lioness throne or bedstead, a senet game board with carved lioness-headed, red-jasper game pieces bearing her pharaonic title, a signet ring, and a partial shabti figurine bearing her name. In the Royal Mummy Cache at DB320, a wooden canopic box with an ivory knob was found that was inscribed with the name of Hatshepsut and contained a mummified liver or spleen as well as a molar tooth. There was a royal lady of the 21st dynasty of the same name, however, and for a while, it was thought possible that it could have belonged to her instead.

Proposed mummy

In 1903, Howard Carter had discovered tomb KV60 in the Valley of the Kings. It contained two female mummies: one identified as Hatshepsut's wetnurse and the other unidentified. In spring 2007, the unidentified body, called KV60A, was finally removed from the tomb by Dr. Zahi Hawass and brought to Cairo's Egyptian Museum for testing. This mummy was missing a tooth, and the space in the jaw perfectly matched Hatshepsut's existing molar, found in the DB320 "canopic box". Based on this, Hawass concluded that the KV60A mummy is very likely Hatshepsut.

While the mummy and the tooth could be DNA tested to see if it belonged to the same person and confirm the mummy's identity, Hawass, the Cairo Museum and some Egyptologists have refused to do it as it would require destroying the tooth to retrieve the DNA. Her death has since been attributed to a benzopyrene carcinogenic skin lotion found in possession of the Pharaoh, which led to her having bone cancer. Other members of the queen's family are thought to have suffered from inflammatory skin diseases that tend to be genetic. Assuming that the mummy is that of Hatshepsut, it is likely that she inadvertently poisoned herself while trying to soothe her itchy, irritated skin. It also would suggest that she had arthritis and bad teeth, which may be why the tooth was removed.

However, in 2011, the tooth was identified as the molar from a lower jaw, whereas the mummy from KV60 was missing a molar from its upper jaw, thus casting doubt on the supposed identification.

Legacy

Exclusion from the historical record 
Toward the end of the reign of Thutmose III and into the reign of his son, an attempt was made to remove Hatshepsut from certain historical and pharaonic records. Her cartouches and images were chiselled off stone walls. Erasure methods ranged from full destruction of any instance of her name or image to replacement, inserting Thutmose I or II where Hatshepsut once stood. There were also instances of smoothing, patchwork jobs that covered Hatshepsut's cartouche; examples of this can be seen on the walls of the Deir el-Bahri temple. Simpler methods also included covering, where new stone was added to fully cover reliefs or sacred stone work.

At the Deir el-Bahari temple, Hatshepsut's numerous statues were torn down and in many cases, smashed or disfigured before being buried in a pit. At Karnak, an attempt was made to wall up her obelisks. While it is clear that much of this rewriting of Hatshepsut's history occurred only during the close of Thutmose III's reign, it is not clear why it happened, other than the typical pattern of self-promotion that existed among the pharaohs and their administrators, or perhaps saving money by not building new monuments for the burial of Thutmose III and instead, using the grand structures built by Hatshepsut.

Amenhotep II, the son of Thutmose III, who became a co-regent toward the end of his father's reign, is suspected by some as being the defacer during the end of the reign of a very old pharaoh. He would have had a motive because his position in the royal lineage was not so strong as to assure his elevation to pharaoh. He is documented, further, as having usurped many of Hatshepsut's accomplishments during his own reign. His reign is marked with attempts to break the royal lineage as well, not recording the names of his queens and eliminating the powerful titles and official roles of royal women, such as God's Wife of Amun.

For many years, presuming that it was Thutmose III acting out of resentment once he became pharaoh, early modern Egyptologists presumed that the erasures were similar to the Roman damnatio memoriae. Egyptologist Donald Redford says that this was not borne out of hatred but was a political necessity to assert his own beliefs. Redford added:

Modern assessment 

In some ways, Hatshepsut's reign was seen as going against the patriarchal system of her time. She managed to rule as regent for a son who was not her own, going against the system which had previously only allowed mothers to rule on behalf of their biological sons. She used this regency to create her female kingship, constructing extensive temples to celebrate her reign, which meant that the public became used to seeing a woman in such a powerful role. This ensured that when the oracle declared her king, the Egyptian public readily accepted her status. 

However, as with other female heads of state in ancient Egypt, this was only done through the use of male symbols of kingship; hence the description of Hatshepsut and others as female kings rather than kings. Hatshepsut was arguably placed in power by men to further their own wealth. She gained power when Egypt had recently amassed extensive wealth, implying that she was placed in power by Egyptian elites due to her record as successful in various domains—as High Priestess or as a placeholder serving for her father Thutmose I in Thebes while he was away on military campaigns. This record of success made such elites confident that she could handle Egyptian wealth and trade, capitalizing on Egypt's moment of prosperity. Indeed, historian Kara Cooney describes Hatshepsut as "arguably, the only woman to have ever taken power as king in ancient Egypt during a time of prosperity and expansion."

Historian Joyce Tyldesley said that Thutmose III may have ordered public monuments to Hatshepsut and her achievements to be altered or destroyed in order to place her in a lower position of co-regent, meaning he could claim that royal succession ran directly from Thutmose II to Thutmose III without any interference from his aunt. This was supported by Thutmose III's officials, and as Hatshepsut's officials either died or were no longer in the public eye, there was little opposition to this. Tyldesley, along with historians Peter Dorman and Gay Robins, say that the erasure and defacement of Hatshepsut's monuments may have been an attempt to extinguish the memory of female kingship (including its successes, as opposed to the female pharaoh Sobekneferu, who failed to rejuvenate Egypt's fortunes and was therefore more acceptable to the conservative establishment as a tragic figure) and re-legitimise his right to rule.

The "Hatshepsut Problem" is a direct link to gender normatives in regards to ancient Egyptian social structures. Although she did hold Queen status, her reign, especially after, was disregarded and even erased. Her reign could be considered more successful than some pharaoh’s reign, for example with expanding borders, which can be seen as a threat to traditional gender roles. This raises questions about the conflict between power and traditional gender roles, and to what extent modernism and conservatism overlap.

The erasure of Hatshepsut's name—by the men who succeeded her for whatever reason—almost caused her to disappear from Egypt's archaeological and written records. When 19th-century Egyptologists started to interpret the texts on the Deir el-Bahri temple walls (which were illustrated with two seemingly male kings) their translations made no sense. Jean-François Champollion, the French decoder of hieroglyphs, said:

This problem was a major issue in late 19th-century and early 20th-century Egyptology, centering on confusion and disagreement on the order of succession of early 18th Dynasty pharaohs. The dilemma takes its name from confusion over the chronology of the rule of Queen Hatshepsut and Thutmose I, II, and III.

See also
 Eighteenth Dynasty of Egypt family tree
 Djehuty, overseer of the treasury under Hatshepsut's rule

Notes

References

 
 
 
 
 
 
 
 

 
 

 
 

 
 
 
 
 
 
 
 
 
 
 
 
 
 
 
 
 
 
 
 
 
 
 
 
 
 
 
 
 
 
 
 
 
 
 
 
 
 
 
 
 
 

 
1458 BC deaths
15th-century BC clergy
15th-century BC Pharaohs
15th-century BC women rulers
16th-century BC births
16th-century BC women rulers
Ancient Egyptian mummies
Ancient Egyptian women in warfare
Androgyny
Children of Thutmose I
Deaths from bone cancer
Deaths from cancer in Egypt
Female pharaohs
Great Royal Wives
Historical negationism in ancient Egypt
Pharaohs of the Eighteenth Dynasty of Egypt
Priestesses of the Eighteenth Dynasty of Egypt
Queens consort of the Eighteenth Dynasty of Egypt
Regents of Egypt
Thutmose II